Sparassis crispa is a species of fungus in the family Sparassidaceae. It is sometimes called cauliflower fungus.

Description
The lobes, which carry the spore-bearing surface, are flat and wavy, resembling lasagna noodles, coloured white to creamy yellow. When young they are tough and rubbery but later they become soft (they are monomitic). The odour is pleasant and the taste of the flesh mild.

The spore print is cream, the smooth oval spores measuring about 5–7 µm by 3.5–5 µm.  The flesh contains clamp connections.

Ecology, distribution and related species
This species is a brown rot fungus, found growing at the base of conifer trunks, often pines, but also spruce, cedar, larch and others. It is fairly common in Great Britain and temperate Europe (but not in the boreal zone).

In Europe there is also a less well-known species of the same genus, Sparassis brevipes, which can be distinguished by its less crinkled, zoned folds and lack of clamp connections.

Culinary use
It is considered a good edible fungus when young and fresh, though it is difficult to clean (a toothbrush and running water are recommended for that process). One French cookbook, which gives four recipes for this species, says that grubs and pine needles can get caught up in holes in the jumbled mass of flesh. The Sparassis should be blanched in boiling water for 2–3 minutes before being added to the rest of the dish. It should be cooked slowly.

See also
 Sparassis spathulata

References

Edible fungi
Fungi described in 1781
Fungi of Europe
Fungi of North America
Polyporales